Helen Keller (1880–1968) was an American author, advocate, activist, and lecturer.

Helen Keller may also refer to:

 Helen Keller (judge), Swiss lawyer and judge
 Helen Rex Keller (1877–1967), American librarian and author of reference books
 Helen Keller (EP), a single by American drag queen Manila Luzon
 Statue of Helen Keller, a sculpture depicting the activist of the same name